Plesetsk Cosmodrome is a Russian spaceport located in Mirny, Arkhangelsk Oblast, about 800 km north of Moscow and approximately 200 km south of Arkhangelsk, the cosmodrome dates to 1957. Originally developed as an ICBM site for the R-7 missile, it also served for numerous satellite launches using the R-7 and other rockets. Its high latitude makes it useful only for certain types of launches, especially the Molniya orbits, so for much of the site's history it functioned as a secondary location, with most orbital launches taking place from Baikonur, in the Kazakh SSR. With the end of the Soviet Union, Baikonur became a foreign territory, and Kazakhstan charged $115 million usage fees annually. Consequently, Plesetsk has seen considerably more activity since the 2000s.

Overview 

Plesetsk is used especially for military satellites placed into high inclination and polar orbits since the range for falling debris is clear to the north which is largely uninhabited Arctic and polar terrain. It is situated in a region of taiga, or flat terrain with boreal pine forests.

The Soyuz rocket, Cosmos-3M, Rokot, Tsyklon, and Angara are launched from the Plesetsk Cosmodrome. The heavy Proton and Zenit rockets can only be land-launched from Baikonur (Zenit may also be launched at sea).

History 

Plesetsk Cosmodrome was originally developed by the Soviet Union as a launch site for intercontinental ballistic missiles under the leadership and supervision of lieutenant general Galaktion Alpaidze. On 11 January 1957, the Soviet government passed the resolution about the foundation of a special military object with the secret name "Angara". This secret object had to be situated in Plesetsk District, Arkhangelsk Oblast. It was named after the town of Plesetsk. The first Soviet Combat formation of intercontinental ballistic missiles R-7 of general designer Sergei Korolev had to be located in that place, in thick northern taiga to the south of Arkhangelsk. The official birthday of the proving ground was 15 July 1957. That day Colonel Gregorjev assumed his post as the missile unit commander. By 15 July 1961, four missile complexes for R-7 ICBMs were at combat status.

In January 1963, a joint decision of the Central Committee of the Communist Party of the Soviet Union and the USSR Council of Ministers created the "Research Proving Ground missile and space weapons USSR Ministry of Defense" near the Ilez railway station, Belsky District of Arkhangelsk Oblast. In the summer of 1963, the state leadership decided to use the Plesetsk launch facilities for launching spacecraft. In September 1963, the Council of Ministers of the USSR 3rd ALM and NIIP converted to "53 minutes Research Proving Ground". Three test management, employees of combat duty, tests of rocket and space complexes, holding and processing of telemetry and trajectory measurements. And from 1964, on the basis of rocket connection started the establishment of research proving ground missiles and space weapons. Such conversion were the favourable geographical location and a significant number of systems already deployed by the end of 1964 were on duty, four launchers R-7A, seven PU P-16U, and three PU R-9A. Since then, the landfill has developed in two directions: rocket and space.

17 March 1966 was the space birthday of Plesetsk. That day was the first missile launching of the rocket booster Vostok with space vehicle Kosmos 112. Since that time, the rocket base "Angara" has become Plesetsk Cosmodrome. Construction started in 1957 and it was declared operational for R-7 rockets in December 1959. The urban-type settlement of Plesetsk in Arkhangelsk Oblast had a railway station, essential for the transport of missile components. A new town for the support of the facility was named Mirny, Russian for "peaceful". By 1997, more than 1,500 launches to space had been made from the site, more than from any other launch facility, although the usage has declined significantly since the break-up of the Soviet Union.

Because Plesetsk was used primarily for military launches, especially Zenit photoreconnaissance satellites, which were launched in large numbers during the 1970s-80s, the USSR did not admit to its existence, but it was discovered by British physics teacher Geoffrey Perry and his students at Kettering Grammar School, who carefully analysed the orbit of the Kosmos 112 satellite in 1966 and deduced it had not been launched from Baikonur Cosmodrome. Meteor 1-2 satellite launch from Plesetsk on 6 October 1969 was one of the earliest launches observed and photographed from Finland. After the end of the Cold War, it was learned that the CIA had begun to suspect the existence of an ICBM launch site at Plesetsk in the late 1950s. The Soviet Union did not officially admit the existence of Plesetsk Cosmodrome until 1983.

The use of the cosmodrome will likely increase in the future since there are concerns with security in operating the Baikonur Cosmodrome in now-independent Kazakhstan, which demands rent for its continued use. Plesetsk is not ideally suited for low inclination or geostationary launches because of its high latitude of 62° north (as compared to the Centre Spatial Guyanais at 5° north or the Kennedy Space Center at 28° 31' north). In addition, the high latitude means that lift capacity for boosters launched from Plesetsk is slightly lower than Baikonur launches. By the 2000s, Russia had completely phased out military launches from Baikonur.

The new all-Russian Angara rocket was designed to be launched primarily from Plesetsk (and also eventually from the Vostochny Cosmodrome).

In May 2007, a new ICBM, called the RS-24 has been tested and launched there, and is seen as eventually replacing the aging RS-18/UR-100Ns (SS-19 Stiletto) and RS-20/R-36Ms (SS-18 Satan) that are the backbone of Russia's missile forces.

In September 2011, Space Forces spokesman Colonel Alexei Zolotukhin said Russia will spend over 5 billion rubles (US$170 million) on the development and expansion of the cosmodrome in 2011. This includes the reconstruction of a local motorway and modernising the energy supply system. New facilities will be built, including a dormitory and hospital.

PL-19 Nudol anti-ballistic missile systems are located at the Cosmodrome, at the former launch site of the Tsyklon-2 rocket.

List of launchpads 
 Pad 16/2: R-7, Molniya, Soyuz-U – 
 Pad 32/1 (inactive since 2001): Tsyklon-3 – 
 Pad 32/2 (inactive since 2009): Tsyklon-3 – 
 Pad 35/1 (2014- ): Angara (previous development for Zenit) – 
 Pad 41/1 (1965-1989): R-7, Vostok-2, Vostok-2M, Voskhod, Soyuz-U – 
 Pad 43/3: R-7, Vostok-2M, Voskhod, Molniya-M, Soyuz-U – 
 Pad 43/4: R-7, Vostok-2M, Voskhod, Molniya-M, Soyuz-U, Soyuz-M, Soyuz-2, Soyuz-2-1v – 
 Pad 131/1 (1967-1969): Kosmos-3M, R-14 – 
 Pad 132/1: Kosmos-3, Kosmos-3M – 
 Pad 132/2: Kosmos-3, Kosmos-3M – 
 Pad 133/1: Kosmos-2I – 
 Pad 133/3: Kosmos-3M, Rokot – 
 Pad 167: mobile ICBM: Topol/Topol-M/RS-24 – 
 Pad 168: mobile ICBM: Topol –

List of active launch silos 
 Plesetsk Cosmodrome Site Yubileynaya: ICBM: Topol-M/RS-24 – 
 Plesetsk Cosmodrome Site Yuzhnaya: ICBM: Topol-M/RS-24 –

Accidents 
 On 26 June 1973, 9 people were killed by an explosion of Kosmos-3M rocket, ready for launch.
 On 18 March 1980, 48 people were killed by an explosion of a Vostok-2M rocket with a Tselina satellite, during a fuelling operation.
 On 15 October 2002, a Soyuz-U carrying the ESA Foton-M1 project failed to launch and exploded, killing one.

See also

 Vostochny Cosmodrome
 Baikonur Cosmodrome
 Svobodny Cosmodrome
 Kapustin Yar

References

External links 

 RussianSpaceWeb.com on Plesetsk
 Plesetsk web site

 
Buildings and structures in Arkhangelsk Oblast
Buildings and structures built in the Soviet Union
Rocket launch sites in Russia
Spaceports in Europe
Soviet and Russian space program locations
Military installations of Russia
1957 establishments in Russia